The Velodromo Sempione  was a multi-purpose stadium in Milan, Italy, which was inaugurated on 27 April 1914.

It hosted a variety of sport events, including cycling, rugby, football, boxing, and basketball.

The velodrome hosted various editions of the Giro di Lombardia. The Sempione also hosted the rugby matches of Sport Club Italia and the football matches of US Milanese and A.C. Milan.

In the 1920s, it was the home ground for the Italy national football team twice.

References

Velodromo Sempione
Sports venues in Milan
Multi-purpose stadiums in Italy
Sports venues completed in 1914
1914 establishments in Europe